Travis Brent (born February 17, 1992) is an American former soccer defender. He is currently the head men’s soccer coach at Franklin Pierce University.

Career

Youth and college
Brent played college soccer at Marshall University between 2010 and 2013. While at college, Brent appeared for USL PDL side Portland Timbers U23's in 2013.

Professional
Out of college, Brent signed with Dutch side Heracles Almelo on August 13, 2014. Brent moved to Almere City FC in June 2015.

Brent returned to the United States in 2017, signing with United Soccer League side Harrisburg City Islanders on March 6, 2017.

Coaching
Brent was named the head coach of the men’s soccer team at Franklin Pierce University on December 20, 2022.

References

External links

1992 births
Living people
American soccer players
Marshall Thundering Herd men's soccer players
Portland Timbers U23s players
Heracles Almelo players
Almere City FC players
Penn FC players
Association football defenders
Soccer players from Virginia Beach
USL League Two players
USL Championship players
Expatriate footballers in the Netherlands
American expatriate sportspeople in the Netherlands
American expatriate soccer players
Sportspeople from Virginia Beach, Virginia